Nicki Hunter (born December 19, 1979) is an American pornographic film director, producer, make-up artist, radio personality, and former pornographic actress.

Career
Hunter was born in Lake Worth, Florida. Hunter's first adult video appearances were released in 2003. She made her directorial debut with the film Psychotic for Python Pictures, which was released on December 2, 2005.

In March 2010, Hunter appeared in a public service announcement for the Free Speech Coalition on the topic of copyright infringement of adult content, directed by Michael Whiteacre.

Hunter performed in pornographic films for 11 years before retiring from performing in 2014, but continues to work in the adult film industry as a director, producer, and make-up artist. She also hosts a show on Vivid Radio, Sirius XM Channel 791.

In 2004, Hunter appeared in the television documentary The Porn King Versus the President.

Personal life
Hunter is married to pornographic actor Jason Horne, with whom she has two sons.

In early 2007, Hunter was diagnosed with lymphoblastic leukemia/lymphoma (T-cell ALL), a complex form of cancer targeting the lymphatic system. Fundraising events were arranged with the help of the porn community to help offset some of her medical costs and expenses due to her suddenly being unable to work.

Awards and nominations

References

External links

 
 
 
 

1979 births
American pornographic film actresses
American pornographic film directors
American pornographic film producers
Living people
People from Lake Worth Beach, Florida
Pornographic film actors from Florida
Women pornographic film directors
American make-up artists
Film directors from Florida
21st-century American women